Prostanthera porcata is a species of flowering plant in the family Lamiaceae and is endemic to the Budawang Range in south-eastern New South Wales. It is a small, erect shrub with glabrous branches, elliptic leaves and deep pink or pink and cream-coloured flowers.

Description
Flowering occurs in spring.

Taxonomy
The species was formally described in 1984 by Barry Conn in the Journal of the Adelaide Botanic Gardens, based on plant material collected in Budawang National Park.

Distribution and habitat
This mintbush grows in forests on steep rocky slopes in association with Eucalyptus agglomerata and E. sieberi and is only known from the Budawang Range in south-eastern New South Wales.

References

porcata
Flora of New South Wales
Lamiales of Australia
Plants described in 1984
Taxa named by Barry John Conn